, was a professional wrestling event promoted by World Wonder Ring Stardom. It took place on July 4, 2021 in Yokohama, Japan, at the Yokohama Budokan with a limited attendance due in part to the ongoing COVID-19 pandemic at the time.  The preshow was broadcast on the Stardom's YouTube channel. The event was available via pay-per-view also featuring English commentary.

Storylines
The show featured six professional wrestling matches that resulted from scripted storylines, where wrestlers portrayed villains, heroes, or less distinguishable characters in the scripted events that built tension and culminated in a wrestling match or series of matches.

The third night of the Stardom Cinderella Tournament 2021 which took place on June 12 saw Saya Kamitani defeating Himeka in the semi-finals of the tournament and finally Maika in the finals to become the Cinderella Tournament winner of 2021. Kamitani issued a challenge to Tam Nakano for the Wonder of Stardom Championship as her granted wish for winning the tournament which Nakano immediately accepted. On the night of the event, Kamitani fell short to Nakano, failing to win the Wonder of Stardom Championship, and shortly after that, Starlight Kid issued a new challenge to the champion dressed in full purple, hinting that she fully embraced Oedo Tai.

After the event, Unagi Sayaka was declared as the next challenger for Syuri's SWA World Championship.

The main event saw Queen's Quest's leader Utami Hayashishita taking on Natsuko Tora for the World of Stardom Championship. However, the Oedo Tai's leader suffered a knee injury during the match with the doctors having no choice but to stop the match prematurely. Therefore, Hayashishita marked her sixth successful title defense in a row.

Future of Stardom Championship Tournament
Due to Saya Iida relinquishing the Future of Stardom Championship after suffering an injury, a seven-woman tournament to crown a new champion was announced to kick off on the second night of the Stardom Cinderella Tournament 2021 on May 14, 2021. The final took place on July 4, the night of the event, where Mina Shirakawa defeated her Cosmic Angels stablemate Unagi Sayaka to win the vacant title. Shirakawa became a double champion after winning the Future of Stardom Championship, while simultaneously holding the Artist of Stardom Championship alongside Sayaka and Tam Nakano.

Results

Notes

References

External links
Page Stardom World

2021 in professional wrestling
World Wonder Ring Stardom shows
Events in Yokohama
Professional wrestling in Yokohama